Littlest Pet Shop is a Hasbro toy franchise. It may also refer to:

Littlest Pet Shop (1995 TV series)
Littlest Pet Shop (2012 TV series)
Littlest Pet Shop (video game)
Littlest Pet Shop: A World of Our Own